RCAF Station Paulson was a Second World War, British Commonwealth Air Training Plan facility located near Dauphin,  Manitoba, Canada.

History
The base was home to No. 7 Bombing and Gunnery School. The proximity to a lake (Dauphin Lake) was important since the lake could be used for bombing and gunnery practice. Wing Commander W. I. Riddell was the first commanding officer when the school opened in 1941.
The station magazine was the "Paulson Post". The school closed 2 Feb 1945 and the Station was decommissioned shortly after. The former airbase was abandoned and has reverted to agricultural use.

Aerodrome
Three runways were listed as follows:

RCAF Station Paulson today
Currently the runways are overgrown but they and the footprints of the buildings are visible in satellite imagery of the area with the foundations of the hangars being most visible due to their lack of overgrowth. There are still a few concrete buildings that are partially standing which are visible from Provincial Trunk Highway 20 which passes near by.

References

 Bruce Forsyth's Canadian Military History Page
 Manitoba Historical Society No. 7 Bombing and Gunnery School

Military history of Manitoba
Defunct airports in Manitoba
Military airbases in Manitoba
Paulson
Paulson